Miriam LaFollette "Mimi" Summerskill (June 2, 1917January 31, 2008) was an American educator, author, political activist, and vineyard owner.

Early life and education
Mimi was the eldest of four children. She grew up in Colfax, Washington where her father, William Leroy LaFollette Jr., was an attorney and politician and her mother was the daughter of the Congregational Church missionary. She was educated in the local public schools. She studied the violin, was rodeo queen, and took lessons in elocution with Ida Lou Anderson. She began college at nearby Washington State University and graduated from Stanford University, where she played the violin in the college orchestra and was part of the Speakers' Bureau.

Media
In the pre-World War II radio era she hosted her own show for NBC, broadcasting from Waikiki Beach in Hawaii. In the 1950s she worked on several programs in the early days of public television for KQED in San Francisco.

Educator
A firm believer in learning through doing, she founded InterAlp, a program that sent American high school students abroad to live with local families in Greece and Kenya. She helped establish the theater at Athens College in Greece.

Vintner
Along with her husband, John Summerskill, she founded LaFollette Vineyard in the Belle Mead section of Montgomery Township, New Jersey. They produced a Seyval blanc in the winery they built on their  vineyard just north of Princeton, New Jersey. Their LaFollette brand was a local favorite and the annual grape harvest was featured in the November 15, 1989, issue of Wine Spectator.

Political activist
Mimi encouraged political dialogue and discussion. Politicians, policy makers, journalists, business people, artists and show business people discussed issues around her pool. During the 1992 presidential campaign, Bill Clinton spent a day at the LaFollette Vineyard discussing political strategy with fourteen Democratic governors and their staffs.

Author and writer
She authored four books: Aegean Summer, Seduced by a Greek Island, Daughter of the Vine, and The Land of Solomon and Sheba.

Family
She was a member of the La Follette family. Her grandfather was Washington state Congressman William La Follette, cousin of Wisconsin Senator Robert La Follette Sr. Indiana educator and Tennessee industrialist Harvey Marion LaFollette was her great uncle. Her father was William Leroy LaFollette Jr., Whitman County, Washington prosecuting attorney and state legislator. The artist Chester La Follette was her uncle. Editor and writer Suzanne La Follette was her aunt. Political leader Richard L. Wright was her son.

References

La Follette family
People from Moscow, Idaho
People from Colfax, Washington
People from Montgomery Township, New Jersey
Stanford University alumni
Writers from Idaho
Writers from New Jersey
Writers from Washington (state)
American people of Welsh descent
1917 births
2008 deaths